The Hat Squad is an American crime drama television series that ran for only one season on CBS from September 16, 1992, to January 23, 1993, during the 1992–1993 season. 13 episodes were made, but only 11 of them aired.

Synopsis
Police officer Mike Ragland and his wife Kitty have adopted three boys whose parents' lives were taken by violence; having been told stories about the police "hat squads" of the past, the three boys grew up to become an elite police unit called The Hat Squad, dressed in street clothes and fedoras. They consist of Buddy, who was just a baby when his father died; Rafael, who doesn't carry a firearm and uses a wide variety of methods to subdue criminals; and Matty, who is studying to become a lawyer.

Cast
 Don Michael Paul . . . Buddy
 Nestor Serrano . . . Rafael
 Billy Warlock . . . Matty
 James Tolkan . . . Mike Ragland
 Janet Carroll . . . Kitty Ragland

Episodes

References

External links

1992 American television series debuts
1993 American television series endings
CBS original programming
1990s American crime drama television series
English-language television shows
Television series by Stephen J. Cannell Productions
Television series by CBS Studios
Television shows set in Los Angeles
American detective television series
Television series created by Stephen J. Cannell